Andrea Carolina Olaya Gutiérrez (born December 9, 1994) is a Colombian freestyle wrestler. She competed in the women's freestyle 75 kg event at the 2016 Summer Olympics, in which she was eliminated in the round of 16 by Adeline Gray.

References

External links
 

1994 births
Living people
Colombian female sport wrestlers
Olympic wrestlers of Colombia
Wrestlers at the 2016 Summer Olympics
Wrestlers at the 2015 Pan American Games
South American Games bronze medalists for Colombia
South American Games gold medalists for Colombia
South American Games medalists in wrestling
Competitors at the 2014 South American Games
Wrestlers at the 2019 Pan American Games
Pan American Games medalists in wrestling
Pan American Games bronze medalists for Colombia
Medalists at the 2019 Pan American Games
Pan American Wrestling Championships medalists
21st-century Colombian women